John Tippetts (1622–1692) was a British shipbuilder and harbour designer who rose to be Surveyor of the Navy, the highest position in British naval architecture.

Life

He was born in Dursley in Gloucestershire in 1622 the son of Richard Tippetts (1600–1663). He was probably apprenticed as a ships carpenter in Bristol.

He is first recorded as a Royal Navy employee in April 1650 as a Master Shipwright at Portsmouth Dockyard.

In 1668 he was appointed Resident Commissioner at Portsmouth Dockyard, a role overseeing dock improvements and repairs, and an intermediary between the Admiralty (Surveyor of the Navy) and the shipwrights. In 1672 he was appointed Surveyor of the Navy, noted in the diary of Samuel Pepys.

He died in 1692 with his will being probated on 28 July 1692. His position at the Admiralty was filled by Edmund Dummer who had been an apprentice shipwright under him at Portsmouth.

Family

Around 1656 he was married to Margaret Stephens, sister of Anthony Stephens, Cashier to the Navy Treasurer. They had five daughters and one son.

Ships Designed

HMS Martin (1652) 14-gun ship
HMS Sussex (1652) 40-gun ship of the line
HMS Bristol (1653) 48-gun ship of the line
"Marigold" (1653) a Hoy
HMS Lyme (1654) a 52-gun ship of the line
HMS Dartmouth (1655) 22-gun ship
HMS Chestnut (1656) 8-gun ketch
HMS Wakefield (1656) 20-gun ship
HMS Monck (1659) 52-gun ship of the line
HMS Royal Oak (1664) 76-gun ship of the line
HMS Portsmouth (1665) 10-gun ketch
HMS Constant Warwick (1666) 34-gun frigate (also designed by Tippetts)
HMS Portsmouth (1667) 4-gun ketch
HMS St Michael (1669) 90-gun ship of the line (also designed by Tippetts) later renamed "Marlborough"
Design of HMS Chichester - completed by Edmund Dummer and launched in 1695

References
 

1622 births
1692 deaths
People from Gloucestershire
British shipbuilders
Surveyors of the Navy